F. Edward Osborne (1925 - March 3, 2014) was an American politician and businessman.

Biography
Born in Oil City, Pennsylvania, Osborne served in the United States Navy during World War II. He then graduated from the Wharton School of Business and was a financial officer for Ore-Ida Foods and H.J. Heinz. In 1968, he moved to Boise, Idaho and was an executive for Ore-Ida retiring in 1988. He served in the Idaho House of Representatives in 1989 and then in the Idaho State Senate in 1991 and 1992. Osborne died in Boise, Idaho.

Notes

1925 births
2014 deaths
People from Boise, Idaho
People from Oil City, Pennsylvania
Businesspeople from Idaho
Wharton School of the University of Pennsylvania alumni
Members of the Idaho House of Representatives
Idaho state senators
20th-century American businesspeople
United States Navy personnel of World War II